Intensive Care is the sixth studio album by English singer-songwriter Robbie Williams, released on 24 October 2005 in the United Kingdom. It was produced by Stephen Duffy and Williams and was the first of Williams' albums to not be produced by longtime songwriting partner Guy Chambers. The album was supported by four singles: "Tripping", "Make Me Pure", "Advertising Space" and "Sin Sin Sin".

Like most of the singer's previous albums, Intensive Care topped the charts in many countries. The album was promoted with the Close Encounters Tour which started on 10 April 2006 in Durban, South Africa and ended on 18 December 2006 in Melbourne, Australia.

Background
After touring Latin America in late 2004 for the promotion of his Greatest Hits album, Williams started working on what would become his sixth studio album. Recorded in his bedroom in the Hollywood Hills, the album was co-written by Stephen Duffy over the course of 24 months. The album was launched in Berlin, Germany on 9 October 2005. It was not shown on television, but broadcast to various locations around the world in cinemas and theatres, in a high-definition "cine-cast". It was shown on Saturday 22 October 2005 on Channel 4.

The album's artwork was designed by Grant Morrison and Frank Quitely, in response to Williams' request that they "turn [Williams] into a superhero" for the tour. The "talismanic images" and "witchy hieroglyphs" include a "sigil" that, in Morrison's words, "can be activated by finding the CD in the shops or pulling the cover up on-screen and pressing Rob's finger. If enough of us do this the world will most certainly enter a new Golden Age of peace, creativity, and prosperity!"

Production 
Williams started recording demos for what would become Intensive Care on 12 June 2003 at Air Studios alongside record producer Stephen Duffy. On that particular day, Duffy played Williams a backing track and he started making up the melody and lyrics of what would later become the song "Sin Sin Sin".

Recording continued throughout the summer of 2003 and by March 2004, the songwriting duo had already recorded several demos including "Sin Sin Sin", "Radio" (which would be released on the Greatest Hits compilation in late 2004), "Ghosts", "Tripping Underwater" (which would later become "Tripping"), "The Trouble With Me" and "Misunderstood" (which would also be released on the Greatest Hits compilation in late 2004).

Release and promotion

When Intensive Care was released in October 2005, it became a smash hit around the world, hitting number-one in the United Kingdom, selling 373,832 copies in its first week, as well as topping charts in twenty other counties including Argentina, Australia, Austria, Germany, Sweden, Switzerland, The Netherlands, New Zealand and many other countries. Following the success of the album, Williams won the MTV Europe Music Award for 'Best Male', and also entered The Guinness Book of World Records for selling 1.6 million tickets in a single day for his 2006 world tour.

The album became the best selling album in Europe by the end of 2005, with sales of over four million copies. However, it only managed to become the third best selling album in the United Kingdom that year. Williams launched the album live in Berlin. He performed 8 of the 12 songs from the album at the live concert.

In January 2007, it was revealed Intensive Care had sold over 5 million copies in Europe, and as such, was certified 5× Platinum by the IFPI. It was also certified 5× Platinum in the United Kingdom around the same time. In Mexico, the album was certified platinum shortly after its release, and later Platinum+Gold in 2006, for shipping 150,000 copies of the physical album. In December 2008 the album was certified 2× diamond for pre-loaded sales of 1,000,000 copies. By shipping 1,100,000 copies and reaching 11× gold, Intensive Care became the eighth best-selling album of the decade in Germany. It also became Williams' fifth album to reach a position in the top twenty of the best-selling album of the decade, with Swing When You're Winning, Escapology, Live at Knebworth and Greatest Hits also earning places. According to EMI, the album has sold 6.2 million copies worldwide.

Williams kicked off his Close Encounters Tour in South Africa in April 2006 in promotion of the album. More than 2.5 million attended the early stages of the tour, with nearly three million having been reported to have seen one or more shows.

Critical reception 
Intensive Care received a varied response from music critics. Alexis Petridis from The Guardian gave the album four out of five stars, writing: "The lovely, lambent melodies of 'Advertising Space' and 'The King of Bloke and Bird' may well be Duffy, the Smiths-like guitar of 'Spread Your Wings' and the autoharp on 'Please Don't Die' definitely is, but their epic qualities seem to stem entirely from Williams."

Lucy Davies from BBC Music gave the album a positive rating stating that: "Williams is putting more self reflection and understanding in his music than ever before, and he's a rich seam of material. Gloriously imperfect, the personality makes the album, and it's his best yet."

John Bush from AllMusic gave the album two and a half stars out of five. He praised songs like "Ghosts", "Tripping" and "Spread Your Wings", but felt that "Duffy's arrangement is a pale shadow of a Smiths song from 20 years earlier." He concluded that the album is "much more interesting than the creatively bankrupt Escapology."

Singles
 "Tripping" was released as the album's lead single on 3 October 2005, becoming an international success, topping the charts in Germany, The Netherlands, Taiwan, Argentina and Mexico. In the United Kingdom, it was released as a double A-side with "Make Me Pure". However, "Make Me Pure" was also released separately in Australia, New Zealand and Mexico.
 "Advertising Space" was released as the album's second single in December 2005, becoming another international hit, reaching the top ten in Europe, Australasia and Latin America.
 "Sin Sin Sin" was released as the album's third and final single in the summer of 2006. It was the first song Williams and Stephen Duffy co-wrote together. The video was shot in Cape Town, South Africa just days before the start of Williams' tour there. It became Williams' first single to miss the UK Top 20, charting at number twenty-two, however, it performed much better internationally, hitting the top ten in Europe and Latin America.

Track listing

Musicians
 Robbie Williams: lead vocals, backing vocals, guitar, bass guitar, Epiphone Casino, synthesizer
 Stephen Duffy: guitar, keyboards, Nord Lead, wine glass, sitar, harp, sequencers, shakers, dilruba, harmonica
 Claire Worrall: backing vocals, (track 11) piano, mellotron, Hammond B3, helicopter
 Melvin Duffy: pedal steel guitar (track 11)
 Neil Taylor: guitar (track 11)
 Greg Leisz: guitar
 Justin Duarte: acoustic guitar
 Jerry Meehan: bass guitar, fender precision (track 11)
 Matt Chamberlain: drums, percussion (track 11)
 Kate Kissoon: backing vocals
 Tessa Niles: backing vocals
 Jeff Babko: trombone (track 11)
 Cleto Escobedo: baritone saxophone (track 11)
 Waddy Wachtel: guitar (track 11)
 Jebin Bruni: synthesizer
 Davey Faragher: bass guitar, Fender Precision
 John Paterno: guitar
 Buddy Judge: guitar
 Max Beesley: percussion, vibes
 Gary Nuttall: backing vocals (track 11)
 Carlton E. Anderson: choir (tracks 3 and 11)
 Maxi Anderson: choir (tracks 3 and 11)
 Randy Crenshaw: choir (tracks 3 and 11)
 Judith Hill: choir (tracks 3 and 11)
 Julia Tillman: choir (tracks 3 and 11)
 Carmen Twillie: choir (tracks 3 and 11)
 Oren Waters: choir (tracks 3 and 11)
 Maxine Waters Willard: choir (tracks 3 and 11)
 Will Wheaton Jnr: choir (tracks 3 and 11)
 Terry Wood: choir (tracks 3 and 11)
 Charlie Bisharat: violins (tracks 1, 2, 3, 5, 6, 8, 10 and 12)
 Mario De Leon: violins (tracks 1, 3, 5, 6 and 8)
 Armen Garabedian: violins (tracks 1, 2, 3, 5, 10 and 12)
 Berj Garabedian: violins (tracks 1, 3, 5, 6 and 8)
 Alan Grunfeld: violins (tracks 1, 3 and 5)
 Sara Pakins: violins (tracks 1, 2, 3, 5, 6, 8, 10 and 12)
 Michelle Richards: violins (tracks 1, 2, 3, 5, 6, 8, 10 and 12)
 Sarah thornblade: violins (tracks 1, 3, 5, 6 and 8)
 Josefina Vergara: violins (tracks 1, 2, 3, 5, 6, 8, 10 and 12)
 John Wittenburg: violins (tracks 1, 2, 3, 5, 6, 8, 10 and 12)
 Denyse Buffum  violins (tracks 1, 2, 3, 5, 6, 8, 10 and 12)
 Matt Funes: cello
 Roland Kato: cello
 Evan Wilson: cello
 Larry Corbett: cello
 Suzie Katayama: cello
 Dan Smith: cello

Credits
Album produced by Stephen Duffy and Robbie Williams
Original production by Andy Strange
Mixed by Bob Clearmountain at Mix This
Engineered by John Paterno, Andy Strange, Stephen Duffy Pablo Munguia, Tony Phillips, Adam Noble and Dan Porter
Strings arranged and conducted by David Campbell
Strings engineered by Alan Sides at NRG
Mastering by Tony Cousins at Metropolis Studios, London
A&R: Chris Briggs
Photography: Hamish Brown
Design and artwork: Grant Morrison and Frank Quitely
Art co-ordination by Tom Hingston Studio

Charts

Weekly charts

Year-end charts

Decade-end charts

Certifications and sales

References

External links
Official site

2005 albums
Robbie Williams albums